Zaulsdorf is a small village in the Vogtlandkreis district, in Saxony, Germany. It is part of the municipality Mühlental.

Geography

The village of Zaulsdorf is accessed by taking the L303 highway to the east out of Oelsnitz.

History

The Zaulsdorf Mill is a central focus of the village.  Prior to 1902, the Zaulsdorf Mill was owned by the Leucht family.  Since then, the mill has been owned by the Halbauer family.  The mill hasn't worked since 1986 and has been turned into dwelling flats. (information taken from emails with Roland Drexler who owns a vacation rental in Zaulsdorf)

References 

Former municipalities in Saxony
Vogtlandkreis